Kevin James O'Neill (born January 24, 1957) is an American basketball coach with experience as the head coach of various college and National Basketball Association (NBA) teams.  Most recently he was the coach of the USC Trojans basketball team.

O'Neill was born in Malone, New York and attended McGill University in Montreal, Quebec, Canada.  He lettered in basketball for three years in college, 1976–79, and in 1978 the McGill Redman had a school-record 28 win season and entered the Canadian Interuniversity Sport men's basketball championship tournament.  He graduated from McGill in 1979 with a bachelor's degree in education, and later earned his master's degree in secondary education from Marycrest College in 1983, where he also served as head coach of the NAIA basketball team for the 1982–83 season.

Early life
Born in Malone, New York, O'Neill grew up in nearby Chateaugay and graduated from Chateaugay Central School in 1975.

Early coaching career

O'Neill's head coaching career began with tenures at North Country Community College (Saranac Lake, New York), Marycrest College (Davenport, Iowa), Marquette, Tennessee and Northwestern.  During his tenure as the Northwestern coach O'Neill is most notably remembered for a game with Indiana where the rowdy Northwestern faithful chanted "Hoosier Daddy" (a play on "Who's Your Daddy?") at opposing coach Bob Knight. Of course this did not sit well with Knight as he and O'Neill got into it during the contest. However all was settled under a practice gym basket well after the game as ESPN camera crews caught the coaches talking their issues out.  He would eventually become an assistant coach under Jeff Van Gundy with the New York Knicks. In 2001, he joined the Detroit Pistons under head coach Rick Carlisle.

Marquette Golden Eagles
As the head coach at Marquette, O'Neill led the then-Warriors to two 20+ win seasons, two NCAA tournament appearances, and a Great Midwest Conference Championship.  O'Neill played a prominent role in the 1994 Oscar-nominated documentary, Hoop Dreams.

Toronto Raptors 2003–04
The McGill University graduate returned to Canada in June 2003 as the head coach of the Toronto Raptors. His tenure was marked by inconsistency among his players, but the team was 25–25 after 50 games and in a position to return to the playoffs. However, injuries to key players resulted in the team going 8–24 to finish the season three games out of a playoff spot.  On April 17, 2004, O'Neill was fired in the aftermath of a disappointing 2003–2004 season,  after making some remarks which were taken to question the team's commitment to winning.

Indiana Pacers
In the 2004–2005 season he was hired as an assistant coach with the Indiana Pacers where he rejoined head coach Rick Carlisle.

Arizona Wildcats 2007–08
On May 1, 2007 it was announced that O'Neill would replace Jim Rosborough as the assistant coach to Hall of Famer Lute Olson at the University of Arizona. O'Neill was an assistant under Olson during Arizona's rise to national prominence in the 1980s, and used it as a launching board to attain his first major head coaching position at Marquette.

On November 4, 2007, Olson announced that he was taking an "indefinite leave of absence", and that O'Neill would assume Olson's head coaching duties in his absence. On December 6 Olson released a statement stating that he would be extending his leave of absence for the remainder of the season.  He cited personal family reasons that required his immediate attention; the next day, his attorney revealed that Olson had filed for divorce from his second wife. The same day it was announced that O'Neill would remain the interim head coach for the rest of the season.

Later the same month, on December 18, Arizona athletic director Jim Livengood announced O'Neill as the designated successor to Olson. Olson said at the time he planned to return for the 2008–09 season; Livengood stated that O'Neill would succeed Olson upon his retirement.  In March 2008, Olson confirmed that he would return as head coach for the 2008–2009 season, and said that he planned to coach until his contract ended in 2011. With the announcement of Olson's return, the O'Neill succession plan was thrown into question amidst media rumors of disagreement between Olson and O'Neill.

Only a month later, Lute Olson announced that O'Neill would not be retained on the University of Arizona staff.  After spending the spring and summer preparing for the upcoming season, Olson abruptly and unexpectedly announced his permanent retirement from the Arizona basketball program in October 2008; his personal physician cited health concerns as the reason.

Memphis Grizzlies 2008–09
In May 2008, O'Neill was hired as an assistant coach & special assistant to the GM  for the Memphis Grizzlies.

USC Trojans 2009–2013
On June 20, 2009, O'Neill was named head coach of the USC men's basketball team.

O'Neill along with noted USC booster Nik Visger were involved in an altercation with an Arizona Wildcats booster at his hotel on March 10, 2011. As a result, O'Neill was suspended for the rest of the Pac-10 tournament,   which resulted in a 67–62 loss for the Trojans.

O'Neill's 2012–2013 entered the season with high hopes based around a number of transfers coming in from other programs. The team started the season 3–6, fueling speculation that it would be O'Neill's last at USC. Much of this speculation was due to the fact that O'Neill sold his Los Angeles home, and relocated to Coronado, CA, which is located over 125 miles away from USC.

On January 14, 2013 Pat Haden, USC Athletic Director, announced that O'Neill had been relieved of his duties at the University after beginning the season 7–10 (2–2 Pac-12).

Broadcasting career
In October 2013, O'Neill joined Fox Sports as a college basketball analyst.

Head coaching record

College

* All 19 wins and 1 tournament loss from 2007–08 season was later vacated
** Final record at Arizona after vacated wins
*** Takes into account vacated wins at Arizona

NBA

|-
| align="left" |Toronto
| align="left" |
|82||33||49||.402|| align="center" |6th in Central||—||—||—||—
| align="center" |Missed Playoffs
|-class="sortbottom"
| align="left" |Career
| ||82||33||49||.402|| ||—||—||—||—

References

External links
 Kevin O'Neill profile @ NBA.com
 Basketball–Reference.com Profile
 College Basketball at Sports–Reference.com Profile

1957 births
Living people
American expatriate basketball people in Canada
Arizona Wildcats men's basketball coaches
Basketball coaches from New York (state)
Basketball players from New York (state)
College basketball announcers in the United States
College men's basketball head coaches in the United States
Delaware Fightin' Blue Hens men's basketball coaches
Detroit Pistons assistant coaches
High school basketball coaches in the United States
Indiana Pacers assistant coaches
Junior college men's basketball coaches in the United States
Marquette Golden Eagles men's basketball coaches
McGill Redmen basketball players
Memphis Grizzlies assistant coaches
New York Knicks assistant coaches
Northwestern Wildcats men's basketball coaches
People from Chateaugay, New York
People from Malone, New York
Tennessee Volunteers basketball coaches
Toronto Raptors head coaches
Tulsa Golden Hurricane men's basketball coaches
USC Trojans men's basketball coaches
American men's basketball players